Rosołówka  is a village in the administrative district of Gmina Bogoria, within Staszów County, Świętokrzyskie Voivodeship, in south-central Poland.

The village has a population of  168.

Demography 
According to the 2002 Poland census, there were 156 people residing in Rosołówka village, of whom 47.4% were male and 52.6% were female. In the village, the population was spread out, with 34% under the age of 18, 34% from 18 to 44, 17.3% from 45 to 64, and 14.7% who were 65 years of age or older.
 Figure 1. Population pyramid of village in 2002 – by age group and sex

References

Villages in Staszów County